Events in the year 1869 in Belgium.

Incumbents
Monarch: Leopold II
Head of government: Walthère Frère-Orban

Events
 Epidemic of typhoid fever in Brussels.
 Brussels-South railway station opens.

February
 20 February – Belgian senate passes a law prohibiting any French company from purchasing Belgian railways.

April
 12 April – Metalworkers' strike at Cockerill in Seraing violently repressed (inspiring Karl Marx to write The Belgian Massacres).
 25 April – Protocol signed to settle railway disputes between France and Belgium.

May
31 May – Horse-drawn buses introduced in Brussels.

September
 8 September – Belgian railways introduce cheap workers' season tickets.

Publications
Periodicals
Almanach royal officiel (Brussels, E. Guyot)
 Analectes pour servir à l'histoire ecclésiastique de la Belgique, vol. 6
 Collection de précis historiques, vol. 18, edited by Edouard Terwecoren S.J.

Studies and reports
 Édouard van den Corput, Origine et cause de l'epidémie de fièvre typhoide qui a règné à Bruxelles en 1869 (Brussels).
 Jean-Auguste Jourdain, Dictionnaire encyclopédique de géographie historique du royaume en Belgique

Literature
 Maria Doolaeghe Najaarsvruchten

Births
 5 April – Isabelle Errera, art historian (died 1929)
 3 June – Prince Baudouin of Belgium (died 1891)

Deaths

 22 January – Prince Leopold, Duke of Brabant, heir to the Belgian throne (born 1859).
 4 February – Johan Michiel Dautzenberg (born 1808), poet and educationalist.
 26 August – Henri Leys (born 1815), painter.
 11 October – François-Joseph Navez (born 1787), painter.
 3 November – Cornelis Broeckx (born 1807), physician and bibliophile

References

 
Belgium
Years of the 19th century in Belgium
1860s in Belgium
Belgium